Eisenman's bent-toed gecko (Cyrtodactylus eisenmanae) is a species of gecko, a lizard in the family Gekkonidae. The species is endemic to Vietnam.

Etymology
The specific name, eisenmanae (feminine, genitive singular), is in honor of American conservationist Stephanie Eisenman of the World Wildlife Fund.

Geographic range
C. eisenmanae is found on Hon Son Island, Kiên Giang Province, extreme southwestern Vietnam.

Habitat
The preferred natural habitat of C. eisenmanae is caves.

Description

Behavior
C. eisenmanae is terrestrial and nocturnal.

Reproduction
C. eisenmanae is oviparous.

References

Further reading
Ngo VT (2008). "Two new cave-dwelling species of Cyrtodactylus Gray (Squamata: Gekkonidae) from Southwestern Vietnam". Zootaxa 1909: 37-51. ("Cyrtodactylus eisenmani [sic]", new species).

Cyrtodactylus
Reptiles described in 2008